 

4GB is an annual international electronic music festival held in Georgia since 2011. It is dedicated to the memory of one of Georgian pioneer DJs, Gio Bakanidze. Since the very first year it has been headlined by Bakanidze's favourite musician, Michael Mayer.

Awards 
In 2013–2017 years, for 5 times in a row, 4GB was awarded the title of year's best festival by Electronauts annual award.

Lineups

References

External links 

Electronic music festivals in Georgia (country)
Music festivals established in 2011